The Miller Block is a historic four-story building in Spokane, Washington. It was designed by William J. Carpenter in the Romanesque Revival style, and built in 1890. It has been listed on the National Register of Historic Places since May 4, 1998.

References

National Register of Historic Places in Spokane County, Washington
Romanesque Revival architecture in Washington (state)
Commercial buildings completed in 1890